Shafizan Hashim (born 2 September 1982) is a Malaysian footballer currently playing as a defender for Kedah FA.

Career 
Hashim a.k.a. "Pelam" has been promoted to the Kedah premier team by Mirandinha starting from 2004 after he spent his football talent with another most success football club in Kedah, Kedah JKR; a club of Public Works Department Malaysia for a couple years. Shafizan was promoted as a regular left-side defender of the team after Shariman Che Omar departed from Kedah squad. On 30 June 2007, he helped Kedah FA win the Malaysian FA Cup after beating Perlis FA 4–2 on penalties (both teams tied at 0–0 after extra time) in Batu Kawan Stadium.

Hashim made his international senior debut against India on 22 July 2008 as a starting eleven. He also represents the Malaysia XI (also known as Malaysia B that represent Malaysia for non 'A'  matches) squad against Chelsea F.C. replacing Mohd Fauzi Nan at Shah Alam Stadium on 29 July 2008.

Achievements 
 Malaysia Super League Champion: 2006/07, 2007/08
 Malaysia Premier League Champion: 2005/06, 2015
 Runner-up: 2005
 Malaysia FA Cup Champion: 2006/07, 2007/08
 Malaysia Cup Champion: 2006/07, 2007/08, 2016
 Runner-up: 2004, 2015

External links 
 https://web.archive.org/web/20140116141605/http://kedahfa.my/wp/?page_id=86

1982 births
Malaysian footballers
Malaysia international footballers
Kedah Darul Aman F.C. players
People from Kedah
Living people
Malaysian people of Malay descent
Association football defenders